Darunak or Dorunak may refer to:
 Dorunak, Fars
 Darunak, Khuzestan
 Dorunak Rural District, in Khuzestan Province